Shir Kola (also Romanized as Shīr Kolā) is a village in Valupey Rural District, in the Central District of Savadkuh County, Mazandaran Province, Iran. At the 2006 census, its population was 129, in 34 families.

References 

Populated places in Savadkuh County